Justin King may refer to:

Justin King (businessman) (born 1961), former CEO of J Sainsbury plc
Justin King (guitarist) (born 1980), American musician and artist
Justin King (American football) (born 1987), American football cornerback